Limbe Botanic Garden or Limbe Botanical Gardens (LBG) is the principal botanic garden of Cameroon. It was created in 1892, during the German colonial era, in Victoria (former name of Limbe), between the ocean and Mount Cameroon. Initially with an agronomic intent, it has become one of the main recreational and tourist attractions of the South-West Region.

Location 
Limbe Botanic Garden is situated on the Morton Bay coast in Limbe, at the mouth of the Limbe River which flows through the garden. It lies in the Fako Division of the South West Province of Cameroon.

History 
In its heyday, it was considered one of the most important tropical botanical gardens in the world.

In 1920 the British took over the garden in collaboration with the Royal Botanic Gardens, Kew, which provided advice and training. After their departure in 1932 and until 1958, the garden was administered directly by Cameroonian staff, then, in the wake of independence, in 1961, it was taken over by the Government.

In 1988 a partnership concluded with the United Kingdom allowed its renovation and development. Originally intended for agriculture, the botanical garden is now oriented towards conservation, education, science, tourism and leisure.

Some buildings, the laboratory and library - have for some time been transformed into a hospital. There is now a luxury hotel there.

Associated personalities 
Past directors of the Limbe Botanic Garden have included:
 from 1892 to 1902: Paul Rudolph Preuss,
 from 1906 to 1907: August Weberbauer,
 from 1927 to 1932: 

Collections 
The garden has around 1,500 taxa (1,000 herbaceous and 500 woody plants). There are rare or threatened plants: 150 endemic, 100 from the southwest, including Calamus, Prunus africana and Gnetum. Certain plants are the subject of particular attention, in particular the African palm trees, the endemics of Mount Cameroon and the Musa. Others are cultivated for conservation purposes: Irvingia gabonensis, Garcinia kola, Cola spp., Prunus africana, Gnetum, Pterocarpus soyauxii, Diospyros, Rauvolfia vomitoria, Nauclea diderrichii, Terminalia spp., Annickia chlorantha, Bryophyllum spp. and Physostigma venenosum.

The botanical garden also houses a herbarium which held around 21,000 specimens in 2001 and, more recently, 30,000. Its acronym in the Index Herbariorum is SCA.

Military cemetery 
The Botanical Garden houses the graves of several soldiers from the Commonwealth of Nations, four from World War I and sixteen from World War II.

Tourism  

A centre of attraction called "Jungle Village" has been set up and serves as a framework for the organisation of cultural events for the enjoyment of tourists. Several landscaped tracks facilitate access within the garden. These are :

    the coastal track, which affords a view of the western part of the garden;
    the biodiversity trail which, as its name suggests, allows visitors to have a view of all the biodiversity of the garden;
    the Bota trail to discover large trees and wild animals;
    the track that runs along the river, where there are trees and plants over a hundred years old.

References

Bibliography 
 
  
  80 pages.
 
  (preface by Charles, Prince of Wales)

External links 

Botanical gardens in Cameroon
Tourist attractions in Limbe
Buildings and structures in Limbe